This is a list of schools in Leicester, England.

State-funded schools

Primary schools 

 Abbey Mead Primary Academy
 Alderman Richard Hallam Primary School
 Avanti Fields School
 Avenue Primary School
 Barley Croft Primary School
 Beaumont Lodge Primary School
 Belgrave St Peter’s CE Primary School
 Braunstone Community Primary School
 Braunstone Frith Primary School
 Bridge Junior School
 Buswells Lodge Primary School
 Caldecote Community Primary School
 Catherine Infant School
 Catherine Junior School
 Charnwood Primary School
 Christ the King RC Academy
 Coleman Primary School
 Dovelands Primary School
 Evington Valley Primary School
 Eyres Monsell Primary School
 Falcons Primary School
 Folville Junior School
 Forest Lodge Academy
 Fosse Mead Primary Academy
 Glebelands Primary School
 Granby Primary School
 Green Lane Infant School
 Hazel Community Primary School
 Heatherbrook Primary Academy
 Herrick Primary School
 Highfields Primary School
 Holy Cross RC School
 Hope Hamilton CE Primary School
 Humberstone Infant Academy
 Humberstone Junior School
 Imperial Avenue Infant School
 Inglehurst Infant School
 Inglehurst Junior School
 Kestrel Mead Primary Academy
 King Richard III Infant and Nursery School
 Knighton Mead Primary Academy
 Krishna Avanti Primary School
 Linden Primary School
 Marriott Primary School
 Mayflower Primary School
 Medway Community Primary School
 Mellor Community Primary School
 Merrydale Infant School
 Merrydale Junior School
 Montrose School
 Mowmacre Hill Primary School
 North Mead Primary Academy
 Overdale Infant School
 Overdale Junior School
 Parks Primary School
 Queensmead Primary Academy
 Rolleston Primary School
 Rowlatts Hill Primary School
 Rushey Mead Primary School
 Sacred Heart RC Academy
 St Barnabas CE Primary School
 St John the Baptist CE Primary School
 St Joseph’s RC Academy
 St Mary's Fields Primary School
 St Patrick’s RC Academy
 St Thomas More RC Academy
 Sandfield Close Primary School
 Scraptoft Valley Primary School
 Shaftesbury Junior School
 Shenton Primary School
 Slater Primary School
 Sparkenhoe Community Primary School
 Spinney Hill Primary School
 Stokes Wood Primary School
 Taylor Road Primary School
 Thurnby Mead Primary Academy
 Tudor Grange Samworth Academy
 Uplands Infant School
 Uplands Junior LEAD Academy
 Whitehall Primary School
 Willowbrook Mead Primary Academy
 Wolsey House Primary School
 Woodstock Primary Academy
 Wyvern Primary School

Secondary schools

 Avanti Fields School, Humberstone
 Babington Academy, Beaumont Leys
 Beaumont Leys School, Beaumont Leys
 Brook Mead Academy, Newfoundpool
 Castle Mead Academy, Black Friars
 City of Leicester College, Evington
 Crown Hills Community College, Crown Hills
 English Martyrs Catholic School, Beaumont Leys
 Fullhurst Community College, Braunstone
 Judgemeadow Community College, Evington
 Lancaster Academy, Knighton
 Madani Schools Federation, Evington
 Moat Community College, Highfields
 New College Leicester, New Parks
 Orchard Mead Academy, Netherhall
 Rushey Mead Academy, Rushey Mead
 St Paul's Catholic School, Evington
 Sir Jonathan North College, Knighton
 Soar Valley College, Belgrave
 Tudor Grange Samworth Academy, A Church of England School

Special and alternative schools 

 Ash Field Academy
 The Children's Hospital School
 Ellesmere College
 Keyham Lodge School
 Leicester City Primary PRU
 Leicester Partnership School
 Millgate School
 Nether Hall School
 Oaklands School
 West Gate School

Further education 
 Gateway College
 Leicester College
 Wyggeston and Queen Elizabeth I College

Independent schools

Primary and preparatory schools 
 Al-Islamia Institute for Education
 Land of Learning Primary School
 Leicester Islamic Academy
 Leicester Preparatory School

Senior and all-through schools

 Al-Aqsa School
 Darul Uloom Leicester
 Emmanuel Christian School
 Imam Muhammad Adam Institute Boys School
 The Imam Muhammad Adam Institute School
 Jameah Academy
 Jameah Boys Academy
 Leicester High School for Girls
 St Crispin's School

Leicester
Schools in Leicester
schools